EVMC/Fort Norfolk is a Tide Light Rail station in Norfolk, Virginia. It opened in 2011 and is the western terminus of the line. It is situated at the intersection of Brambleton and Colley Avenues, just west of downtown and south of the historic Ghent district.

The station serves Eastern Virginia Medical Center, consisting of Sentara Norfolk General Hospital, Children's Hospital of the King's Daughters, Eastern Virginia Medical School, the Norfolk Ronald McDonald House, Norfolk Public Health Center and American Red Cross Center, which combined have almost 20,000 employees. This stop also serves Fort Norfolk and the international headquarters for PETA.

References

External links 
 EVMC / Fort Norfolk station

Tide Light Rail stations
Railway stations in the United States opened in 2011
2011 establishments in Virginia